The Anglican Diocese of Osun North is one of 17 within the Anglican Province of Ibadan, itself one of 14 provinces within the Church of Nigeria. The bishop is Abiodun Olaoye.

Notes

Church of Nigeria dioceses
Dioceses of the Province of Ibadan